Lunar Polar Hydrogen Mapper, or LunaH-Map, is one of 10 CubeSats launched with Artemis 1 on 16 November 2022. Along with Lunar IceCube and LunIR, LunaH-Map will help investigate the possible presence of water-ice on the Moon. Arizona State University began development of LunaH-Map after being awarded a contract by NASA in early 2015. The development team consists of about 20 professionals and students led by Craig Hardgrove, the principal investigator. The mission is a part of NASA's SIMPLEx program.

Objective 
LunaH-Map's primary objective is to map the abundance of hydrogen down to one meter beneath the surface of the lunar south pole. It will be inserted into a polar orbit around the Moon, with its periselene located near the lunar south pole, initially passing above Shackleton crater. LunaH-Map will provide a high resolution map of the abundance and distribution of hydrogen rich compounds, like water, in this region of the Moon and expand on the less accurate maps made by previous missions. This information may then be used to improve scientific understanding of how water is created and spread throughout the Solar System or used by future crewed missions for life support and fuel production.

LunaH-Map, along with other long distance CubeSat missions like Mars Cube One, will demonstrate vital technologies for including CubeSats in other interplanetary missions.

History 
LunaH-Map was conceived in a discussion between Craig Hardgrove and future LunaH-Map chief engineer, Igor Lazbin, about issues with the spatial resolution of various neutron detectors in use around Mars. Similar issues are present in current maps of hydrogen distributions on the Moon, so Hardgrove designed LunaH-Map to orbit closer to the lunar south pole than previous crafts to improve the resolution of these maps.

By April 2015, Hardgrove had assembled a team composed of members of various government, academic and private institutions and drafted a proposal to NASA. In early 2015, LunaH-Map was one of two CubeSats chosen by NASA's Science Mission Directorate through the Small Innovative Missions for Planetary Exploration (SIMPLEx) program, along with Q-PACE.

Hardware 
Because of the scope of this mission, several unique challenges need to be addressed in implementing hardware. Typical low Earth orbit (LEO) CubeSats can use off-the-shelf hardware, or parts available commercially for other uses, but because LunaH-Map is intended to run longer and travel further than most LEO CubSat missions, commercial parts cannot be expected to perform reliably for the mission duration unmodified. Also, unlike most conventional CubeSats, LunaH-Map will need to navigate to its desired orbit after leaving the launch vehicle, so it will need to be equipped with its own propulsion system.

The primary science instrument will be a scintillation neutron detector composed of elpasolite (Cs2YLiCl6:Ce or CLYC). This material is a scintillator, which measurably glows when it interacts with thermal and epithermal neutrons. LunaH-Map's neutron detector will consist of an array of eight 2.5 × 2.5 × 2 cm CLYC scintillators.

Mission 
LunaH-Map launched with Artemis 1 from Kennedy Space Center on November 16, 2022. It was deployed from the Orion Stage Adapter 5 hours and 33 minutes after launch. Ground controllers were able to contact the CubeSat soon after using NASA's Deep Space Network. They began commissioning spacecraft systems but ran into problems with the propulsion system. As a result LunaH-Map didn't perform the maneuver it was scheduled to during its lunar flyby on November 21.

If they are able to get the propulsion system working properly within the next few months, then the mission can likely still be salvaged. The fault is believed to have been caused by a propulsion system valve which is partially stuck. The spacecraft is currently heating the valve in an attempt to free it.

In spite of the fault with the propulsion system, LunaH-Map has begun using its instruments and returning data, including neutrons detected during its flyby and images of the moon taken with its star tracker. Before their next attempt at igniting the propulsion system, NASA plans to conduct an auto-navigation experiment and ranging tests with the Deep Space Network. NASA officials are also investigating other possible targets that LunaH-Map can investigate if the propulsion system is not fixed in time to enter polar orbit of the Moon.

See also 

The 10 CubeSats flying in the Artemis 1 mission
 Near-Earth Asteroid Scout by NASA was a solar sail spacecraft that was planned to encounter a near-Earth asteroid (mission failure)
 BioSentinel is an astrobiology mission
 LunIR by Lockheed Martin Space
 Lunar IceCube, by the Morehead State University
 CubeSat for Solar Particles (CuSP)
 Lunar Polar Hydrogen Mapper (LunaH-Map), designed by the Arizona State University
 EQUULEUS, submitted by JAXA and the University of Tokyo
 OMOTENASHI, submitted by JAXA, was a lunar lander (mission failure)
 ArgoMoon, designed by Argotec and coordinated by Italian Space Agency (ASI)
 Team Miles, by Fluid and Reason LLC, Tampa, Florida

The 3 CubeSat missions removed from Artemis 1
 Lunar Flashlight will map exposed water ice on the Moon
 Cislunar Explorers, Cornell University, Ithaca, New York
 Earth Escape Explorer (CU-E3), University of Colorado Boulder

References

External links 
 Official website
 The Lunar Polar Hydrogen Mapper mission: Mapping hydrogen distribution in permanently shadowed regions of the Moon's South Pole (Presentation to Lunar Exploration Analysis Group, 2015)
 Interview with Craig Hardgrove on ASU Connections Podcast

CubeSats
Missions to the Moon
NASA space probes
Space probes launched in 2022
2022 in the United States
Secondary payloads
Satellites orbiting the Moon